A blunt is a cigar that has been hollowed out and filled with cannabis. It is rolled with the tobacco-leaf "wrap", usually from an inexpensive cigar, or any other wrap that isn’t a joint paper that has glue. A blunt is different from a joint, which uses rolling papers.

History and etymology

The practice originated in cities such as New York City, Philadelphia, and Baltimore. Blunts take their name from Phillies Blunt brand cigars, although any commonly available inexpensive cigar or cigarillo may be used, depending on suitability and availability. Other common synonyms  for a blunt include "El-P" or "L" (from the El Producto brand) and "Dutch" (from Dutch Masters). Backwoods, Swisher Sweets, White Owl and 4ks cigars/cigarillos are other popular brands for rolling blunts.

Readymade blunts
Blunts also come as ready made tobacco wraps with hundreds of flavors across numerous brands.
In addition to using cheap cigars and cigarillos to smoke cannabis, cigar wraps or "blunt wraps" are also used.

Tobacco industry term
In the tobacco industry, a blunt is defined as a cigar that is wider than a cigarillo and not quite as wide as a Corona. A cigarillo that has been split and re-rolled with marijuana is still called a blunt in cannabis culture.

Nicotine addiction
Due to the tobacco content in the wrapper leaf, blunts carry with them the risks of tobacco use, including nicotine addiction.

See also

 Joint (cannabis)
 Cannabis smoking
 Cannabis consumption
 Smoking

References

American slang
Cannabis culture
Cannabis smoking
Cigars